Ouvrage Bois- Karre is located in the Fortified Sector of Thionville of the Maginot Line, facing the France - Luxembourg border. The petit ouvrage is situated in the Cattenom Forest between the gros ouvrages Soetrich and Kobenbusch, just south of Boust. It is unusual for a Maginot fortification in its construction as a single blockhouse, with no underground gallery system or remotely located entries. Bois-Karre has been preserved and is maintained as a museum.

Design and construction 
Bois-Karre was surveyed by CORF (Commission d'Organisation des Régions Fortifiées), the Maginot Line's design and construction agency, in 1930. Work by the contractor Degaine-Dubois began in 1931, and the position became operational in 1935, at a cost of 10 million francs.

Bois-Karre was planned as an anchor point for a fortified line of retreat from the Cattenom salient formed by Kobenbusch and Oberheid. A firing chamber is arranged to cover the reinforcing line  (bretelle de Cattenom), which was to be anchored at its other end by Block 2 of Ouvrage Galgenberg. The reinforcing line was never built.

Description 
The single two-level combat block comprises two firing chambers and one machine gun turret.  The west firing chamber was armed with a machine gun embrasure and a machine gun/47 mm anti-tank gun embrasure (JM/AC47).  The east firing chamber was equipped with two JM/AC47 embrasures and a JM embrasure.  Three automatic rifle cloches (GFM) on the surface provided spotting for ouvrage Métrich, along with a machine gun turret.  The integral usine was equipped with two  Renault engines.

Several casemates, observatories and infantry shelters are located around Bois-Karre, including
 Casemate de Basse-Parthe Ouest: Single classmate flanking to the west with one JM/AC37 embrasure, one JM embrasure and one GFM cloche.
 Casemate de Basse-Parthe Est: Single classmate flanking to the east with one JM/AC37 embrasure, one JM embrasure and one GFM cloche.
 Abri du Bois-Karre: Surface shelter for one infantry section, with  two GFM cloches.
 Abri du Rippert: Subsurface shelter for two infantry sections and the quarter command post, two GFM cloches.
 Abri du Bois-de-Cattenom: Surface shelter for one infantry section, two GFM cloches.
None of these are connected to the ouvrage or to each other. All were built by CORF. The Casernement de Cattenom provided peacetime above-ground barracks and support services to Bois-Karre and other ouvrages in the area.

Manning 
The garrison comprised 91 men and two officers of the 168th Fortress Infantry Regiment under Sub-Lieutenant Boulay.

History
See Fortified Sector of Thionville for a broader discussion of the events of 1940 in the Thionville sector of the Maginot Line.

Current condition 
The ouvrage which retains a large portion of its equipment, has been restored and may be visited.

See also 
 List of all works on Maginot Line
 Siegfried Line
 Atlantic Wall
 Czechoslovak border fortifications

Notes

References

Bibliography 
Allcorn, William. The Maginot Line 1928–45. Oxford: Osprey Publishing, 2003. 
Degon, André; Zylberyng, Didier, La Ligne Maginot: Guide des Forts à Visiter, Editions Ouest-France, 2014.  
Kaufmann, J.E. and Kaufmann, H.W. Fortress France: The Maginot Line and French Defenses in World War II, Stackpole Books, 2006. 
Kaufmann, J.E., Kaufmann, H.W., Jancovič-Potočnik, A. and Lang, P. The Maginot Line: History and Guide, Pen and Sword, 2011. 
Mary, Jean-Yves; Hohnadel, Alain; Sicard, Jacques. Hommes et Ouvrages de la Ligne Maginot, Tome 1. Paris, Histoire & Collections, 2001.  
Mary, Jean-Yves; Hohnadel, Alain; Sicard, Jacques. Hommes et Ouvrages de la Ligne Maginot, Tome 2. Paris, Histoire & Collections, 2003.  
Mary, Jean-Yves; Hohnadel, Alain; Sicard, Jacques. Hommes et Ouvrages de la Ligne Maginot, Tome 3. Paris, Histoire & Collections, 2003.  
Mary, Jean-Yves; Hohnadel, Alain; Sicard, Jacques. Hommes et Ouvrages de la Ligne Maginot, Tome 5. Paris, Histoire & Collections, 2009.

External links 
 Ouvrage Bois-Karre official site
 Bois Karre at fortiff.be 
 L'ouvrage du Bois-Karre at alsacemaginot.com 
 ouvrage du Bois Karre at lignemaginot.com 
 Petit Ouvrage du Bois Karre at mablehome.com 
 Ouvrage d'infanterie du Bois Karre at wikimaginot.eu 

BOIS
Maginot Line
World War II museums in France